Amarapur is a village in Mansa Taluka of Gandhinagar district in Gujarat, India. It is situated on the banks of Sabarmati river.

Institutes
Grambharati, a social service organisation, runs several cooperative societies and the National Innovation Foundation - India. The institute is involved in innovation in grassroots technology and traditional knowledge.

Economy
Agriculture is the main source of income for this village. Swapna Shrishti Water Park is located near the village.

References

Villages in Gandhinagar district